Machine Men was a Finnish heavy metal band that originally formed as an Iron Maiden cover band.

Vocalist Toni Parviainen started singing in 1998, with inspiration from Bruce Dickinson. Machine Men took their name from a song present on Dickinson's 1998 album "The Chemical Wedding".

After a two-year hiatus, the band broke up in February 2011 due to lack of interest from the members.

Former Band members
 Toni "Antony" Parviainen - Vocals
 Turbo J-V - Guitar
 Jani Noronen - Guitar
 Eero Vehniäinen - Bass
 Jarno Parantainen - Drums

Discography

Machine Men (EP) (2002)
 Men Inside the Machine
 Eye of the Truth
 The Slave Trade
 Enjoy Insanity
 Aces High (Iron Maiden Cover)

Scars & Wounds (2003)
 Against the Freaks
 The Gift
 The Beginning of the End
 Silver Dreams
 Man in Chains
 Betrayed by Angels
 Victim
 Scars & Wounds
 Men Inside the Machine - Japanese Bonus Track
 Eye of the Truth - Japanese Bonus Track

-There is a hidden track (03:44) after "Scars & Wounds" which seems to be a reprise of the title track.

-Some versions have the "Machine Men" EP as bonus tracks (the Russian version e.g.)

Elegies (2005)
 Falling
 Dream and Religion
 Apathy
 Back from the Days
 The Traitor
 October
 Daytime Theatre
 Doors of Resurrection
 From Sunrise to Sunset
 Freak (Bruce Dickinson Cover)
 Dream & Religion (industrial ver.) - Limited Edition Bonus Track

Circus of Fools (2007)
 Circus of Fools
 No Talk Without the Giant
 Ghost of the Seasons
 Tyrannize
 The Shadow Gallery
 Where I Stand
 Border of the Real World
 Dying Without a Name
 Cardinal Point
 Till' the End of Her Days - Japanese Bonus  Track
 October (Acoustic ver.) - Japanese Bonus Track

References

External links
 Official website
 Machine Men's official Myspace

Finnish heavy metal musical groups
Finnish power metal musical groups
Musical groups established in 1998
Musical groups disestablished in 2011